The 1997 Croatia Open Umag was a men's tennis tournament played on outdoor clay courts in Umag, Croatia that was part of the World Series of the 1997 ATP Tour. It was the eighth edition of the tournament and was held from 21 July until 27 July 1997. Third-seeded Félix Mantilla won the singles title.

Finals

Singles

 Félix Mantilla defeated  Sergi Bruguera, 6–3, 7–5
It was Mantilla's 3rd title of the year and the 4th of his career.

Doubles

 Dinu Pescariu /  Davide Sanguinetti defeated  Dominik Hrbatý /  Karol Kučera, 7–6, 6–4
It was Pescariu's only career title. It was Sanguinetti's 1st career title.

See also
 1997 Croatian Bol Ladies Open

References

External links
 ITF tournament edition details

Croatia Open Umag
Croatia Open
Croatia Open Umag